Rostaq Rural District is a rural district (dehestan) in the Central District of Khomeyn County, Markazi Province, Iran. At the 2006 census, its population was 6,033, in 1,620 families. The rural district has 23 villages.

References 

Rural Districts of Markazi Province
Khomeyn County